Chaerilus ceylonensis is a species of scorpion in Chaerilidae family. It is endemic to Sri Lanka.

Description
Total length is 27 to 45 mm. It has two pairs of lateral eyes and one pair of median eyes. Movable fingers of pedipalps consists with 11 to 12 rows of granules. Fingers are straight and short. Pedipalp chela consists with 9 carinae. There are 4 to 6 pectinal teeth. Carapace covered by granules. Mesosoma is without carinae. Sternites are smooth. First and second metasomal segments have 10 carinae, whereas third and fourth segments have 8 carinae. Fifth segment has 7 carinae.

References

Chaerilidae
Animals described in 1894
Endemic fauna of Sri Lanka
Scorpions of Asia